The 2008–09 Wichita Thunder season was the 17th season of the CHL franchise in Wichita, Kansas.

Regular season

Conference standings

Note: x - clinched playoff spot; y - clinched conference title;  e - eliminated from playoff contention

Awards

See also
2008–09 CHL season

External links
2008–09 Wichita Thunder season at Hockey Database

Wichita Thunder seasons
Wich